Mito may refer to:

Places 
Mito, Ibaraki, capital city of Ibaraki Prefecture, Japan
Mito, Aichi, a Japanese town
Mito, Shimane, a Japanese town
Mitō, Yamaguchi, a Japanese town
Mito District, a district in the province of Concepción, Peru
Mito Domain, a Japanese domain in the Edo period

People with the surname 
, Japanese model, television personality and singer

Fictional characters
 Mito (Hunter × Hunter), a character from the manga series Hunter × Hunter
 Anji Mito, a character from the video game Guilty Gear
 Ikumi Mito, a character from Shokugeki no Sōma

Other 
Mitochondrial disease, a group of disorders caused by mitochondrial dysfunction
Cagiva Mito, an Italian sports motorcycle made by Cagiva
Alfa Romeo MiTo, a mini Italian sports car made by Alfa Romeo between 2008 and 2018
Vasconcellea candicans, a South American plant
Mito, a type of currency in the video game Drift City
Mito House, a branch of the Tokugawa Gosanke clan in Japan
Minimum Interval Take Off, an Air Force technique
Space Pirate Mito, an anime series
 Nickname of Brazilian President Jair Bolsonaro

See also

 Art Tower Mito, an arts complex in Mito, Ibaraki, Japan
Miko (disambiguation)
Milo (disambiguation)
MIMO (disambiguation)
Miño (disambiguation)
Mio (disambiguation)
Miso (disambiguation)
MIT (disambiguation)
Mite (disambiguation)
Mitu (disambiguation)

Japanese-language surnames